Rangelands are grasslands, shrublands, woodlands, wetlands, and deserts that are grazed by domestic livestock or wild animals. Types of rangelands include tallgrass and shortgrass prairies, desert grasslands and shrublands, woodlands, savannas, chaparrals, steppes, and tundras. Rangelands do not include forests lacking grazable understory vegetation, barren desert, farmland, or land covered by solid rock, concrete and/or glaciers.

Rangelands are distinguished from pasture lands because they grow primarily native vegetation, rather than plants established by humans. Rangelands are also managed principally with practices such as managed livestock grazing and prescribed fire rather than more intensive agricultural practices of seeding, irrigation, and the use of fertilizers.

Grazing is an important use of rangelands but the term rangeland is not synonymous with grazingland. Livestock grazing can be used to manage rangelands by harvesting forage to produce livestock, changing plant composition, or reducing fuel loads.

Fire is also an important regulator of range vegetation, whether set by humans or resulting from lightning. Fires tend to reduce the abundance of woody plants and promote herbaceous plants including grasses, forbs, and grass-like plants. The suppression or reduction of periodic wildfires from desert shrublands, savannas, or woodlands frequently invites the dominance of trees and shrubs to the near exclusion of grasses and forbs.

Types of rangeland
The United States Environmental Protection Agency defines rangeland as "lands on which the native vegetation (climax or natural potential plant community) is predominantly grasses, grass-like plants, forbs, or shrubs suitable for grazing or browsing use." The EPA classifies natural grassland and savannas as rangeland, and in some cases includes wetlands, deserts, tundra, and "certain forb and shrub communities."  The primary difference between rangeland and pasture is management; rangelands tend to have natural vegetation along with a few introduced plant species, but all managed by grazing, while pastures have forage that is adapted for livestock and managed, by seeding, mowing, fertilization and irrigation.

Prairie
Prairies are considered part of the temperate grasslands, savannas and shrublands biome by ecologists, based on similar temperate climates, moderate rainfall, and grasses, herbs, and shrubs, rather than trees, as the dominant vegetation type. Temperate grassland regions include the Pampas of Argentina, and the steppes of Eurasia.

Grasslands
Grasslands are areas where  the vegetation is dominated by grasses (Poaceae) and other herbaceous (non-woody) plants. However, sedge (Cyperaceae) and rush (Juncaceae) families can also be found. Grasslands occur naturally on all continents except Antarctica. In temperate latitudes, such as northwest Europe and the Great Plains and California in North America, native grasslands are dominated by perennial bunch grass species, whereas in warmer climates annual species form a greater component of the vegetation.

Steppe
Steppe, in physical geography, refers to a biome region characterized by grassland plain without trees apart from those near rivers and lakes. The prairie (especially the shortgrass and mixed prairie) is an example of a steppe, though it is not usually called such. It may be semi-desert, or covered with grass or shrubs or both, depending on the season and latitude. The term is also used to denote the climate encountered in regions too dry to support a forest, but not dry enough to be a desert.

Pampas
This area is also one of the distinct physiography provinces of the larger Paraná-Paraguay Plain division. These plains contain unique wildlife because of the different terrains around it. Some of this wildlife includes the rhea, the badger, and the prairie chicken.

Shrubland
Shrubland is a plant community characterized by vegetation dominated by shrubs, often also including grasses, herbs, and geophytes. Shrubland may either occur naturally or be the result of human activity. It may be the mature vegetation type in a particular region and remain stable over time, or a transitional community that occurs temporarily as the result of a disturbance, such as fire.  A stable state may be maintained by regular natural disturbance such as fire or browsing.  Shrubland may be unsuitable for human habitation because of the danger of fire. The term "shrubland" was first coined in 1903.

Woodland
Woodland is a low-density forest forming open habitats with plenty of sunlight and limited shade. Woodlands may support an understory of shrubs and herbaceous plants including grasses. Woodland may form a transition to shrubland under drier conditions or during early stages of primary or secondary succession. Higher densities and areas of trees, with largely closed canopy, provide extensive and nearly continuous shade are referred to as forest.

Savanna
Savanna is a grassland ecosystem characterized by the trees being sufficiently small or widely spaced so that the canopy does not close.  The open canopy allows sufficient light to reach the ground to support an unbroken herbaceous layer consisting primarily of C4 grasses.

Desert
In the Köppen climate classification system, deserts are classed as BWh (hot desert) or BWk (temperate desert). In the Thornthwaite climate classification system, deserts would be classified as arid megathermal climates.

Tundra
Tundra is a biome where the tree growth is hindered by low temperatures and short growing seasons. The term tundra comes through Russian тундра from the Kildin Sami word tūndâr "uplands," "treeless mountain tract." There are three types of tundra: Arctic tundra, alpine tundra, and Antarctic tundra In tundra, the vegetation is composed of dwarf shrubs, sedges and grasses, mosses, and lichens. Scattered trees grow in some tundra. The ecotone (or ecological boundary region) between the tundra and the forest is known as the tree line or timberline.

North America

Canada
Rangeland is a prominent feature of rural Canada. A provincial jurisdiction, administration and policy regarding range use varies across the country. As in many other Commonwealth countries, public tenures on crown land for the purpose of range activities are common in geographically compatible areas. Reconciling the economic needs of ranchers and the need for environmental conservation is one of the primary themes in modern range discourse.

In western Canada, both grassland and forested range are significant.  In British Columbia, 70 percent of grassland range is privately owned and 60 percent of the total annual livestock forage requirement is provided by grazing on Crown rangeland (34 million hectares),  80 percent of which is forested range.  Grassland range predominates in much of the prairie provinces’ ranching area; however, forested range is particularly important in the boreal region.

Certain rangelands are preserved as provincially-protected areas similar to parks, others are managed as community resources.  For example, in Alberta since 2003 there has been legislation allowing the creation of "Heritage Rangelands" within the parks system. As of 2012 there were 2 heritage rangelands and 6 proposed future heritage rangelands run by Alberta Parks.  There are also 32 provincial grazing reserves located throughout Alberta administered as public lands by Alberta Sustainable Resource Development. The federal government has administered several "Community Pastures" in Western Canada that were reclaimed lands suffering erosion during the 1930s.  In 2012, it was announced that this federal involvement would be phased out over a six-year period.

United States

Of the land within the United States borders, 36% is considered rangeland.  The western side of the United States is 53% rangeland. Around 399 million acres (1,610,000 km2) of rangeland are privately owned. The Bureau of Land Management manages about 167 million acres (676,000 km2) of publicly owned rangeland, with the United States Forest Service managing approximately 95 million acres (380,000 km2) more. Ranchers may lease portions of this public rangeland and pay a fee based on the number and type of livestock and the period for which they are on the land.

Historically much of the land in the western United States was used for grazing and much of some states still is. In many of those states, such as Arizona, an open-range law applies which requires a land owner to fence cattle out rather than in; thus cattle are theoretically allowed to roam free. In modern times open-range laws can conflict with urban development as occasional stray cows, bulls, or even herds wander into subdivisions or onto highways.

North American rangelands - grasslands
Tall Grass Prairie
Mixed Grass Prairie
Short Grass Prairie
Pacific Bunchgrass
Annual Grasslands

North American rangelands - shrublands
Sagebrush Steppe
Salt Desert Shrublands
Desert Shrublands

Elsewhere
The different types of rangeland together form about 70% (excluding Antarctica) of the Earth's surface.

Australia 
Australia’s rangelands extend from tropical savannas in the north dominated by summer rainfall, though large areas of desert in central Australia to the southern rangelands dominated by winter rainfall. They cover approximately 80 per cent of the Australian continent and equate broadly with the ‘Outback’. However, rangelands also occur in higher rainfall areas where limitations other than rainfall restrict use to management of the natural landscape. The rangelands are where values and societal benefits are based primarily on natural resources. They are areas which have not been intensively developed for agriculture but extensive livestock production is a major land use, accounting for 55 per cent of the rangelands.  Conservation reserves utilise around 11 per cent of the rangelands and the rangelands have areas of significant biodiversity and natural attractions on a world scale.  Although mining and petroleum extraction uses a very small percentage of the rangelands, it economically contributes most to Australia’s Gross Domestic Product compared with other rangeland industries (cattle, sheep and goat production, tourism, harvesting of native products). Indigenous land tenures of various types cover around 59 per cent of the rangelands and overlap with grazing and conservation uses.  Although rangelands cover 80 per cent of Australia’s land mass, at the 2016 Census, they were home to just over two per cent of the population (394,000 people), with 28 per cent of rangeland residents identifying as being Indigenous.

South America 
Rangelands in South America are located in regions with climate ranging from arid to sub-humid.  Annual precipitation in these areas ranges from  approximately 150 to 1500 mm (6–60 inches).  Within South America, rangelands cover about 33% of the total land area.  South American rangelands include; grasslands, shrublands, savannas, and hot and cold deserts.  Rangelands in South America exclude hyperarid deserts.  Examples of the South American rangelands include the; Patagonian Steppe, the Monte, the Pampas, the "Lianos" or   "Cerrado," the "Chaco" and the "Caatinga."
The change in the intensity and location of tropical thunderstorms and other weather patterns is the driving force in the climates of southern South America.

Africa 
In Kenya, rangelands make up for 85% of the land surface area, and are largely inhabited by nomadic pastoralists who are largely dependent on livestock. This movement often brings along an incursion of different diseases with the common one being the rinderpest virus in the Kenyan wildlife population from the Somali ecosystem.

Asia 
In the past, rangelands in western China supported a pastoral economy and large wildlife populations.  Now the rangelands have shrunk due to population growth, economic, government, and social factors.  Rangeland types in China include; Semi-desert,  Dry Alpine Grasslands, Alpine Dwarf Shrub, Wetland types.

Uses of rangeland
Rangelands produce a wide variety of goods and services desired by society, including livestock forage (Grazing), wildlife habitat, water, mineral resources, wood products, wildland recreation, open space and natural beauty. The geographic extent and many important resources of rangelands make their proper use and management vitally important to people everywhere.

Gallery

See also

Applied ecology
Coastal plain
Coastal prairie
Experimental range
Field
Forage
Grassland
Grass valley
Holistic management
Meadow
Pasture
Potrero
Plain
Prairie
Range condition scoring
Savanna
Steppe
Veld

References

External links 
 Rangelands 1979-2003 archive - freely available volumes published by The Society For Range Management
Society for Range Management
Bureau of  Land Management
USDA Forest Service
University of Idaho - Rangeland Ecology and Management
Information about Australian Rangelands

Grasslands
Temperate grasslands, savannas, and shrublands